Richard Learoyd (born 1966) is a British contemporary artist and photographer.

Early life and work
Richard Learoyd was born in the small mill town of Nelson, Lancashire, England in 1966. At the age of 15, his mother insisted he take a pinhole photography workshop, which he attributes as the start of his interest in photography. In 1990 he graduated from the Glasgow School of Art with a degree in Fine Art Photography. While there he studied with American photographer Thomas Joshua Cooper. In 1991 Learoyd was awarded an artist-in-residence at the Scottish Ballet. Learoyd taught photography at Bournemouth and Poole College from 1994 until 1999. In 2000, he moved to London where he worked as a commercial photographer.

Publications

Publications by Learoyd
 Richard Learoyd Twenty-Two Photographs: 2005-07. London: Self-published, 2008. Essay by Martin Barnes and Chris Bucklow.
 Richard Learoyd Unique Photograph: 2007-09. New York: McKee Gallery, 2009. Interview by Chris Bucklow.
 Presences. San Francisco: Fraenkel Gallery, 2011. ASIN B0086RVF6C
 Portraits and Figures. New York: McKee Gallery, 2011. Essay by Mark Alice Durant.
 Richard Learoyd: Still/Life. New York: Mckee Gallery, 2013. ASIN B00I7UWV0M. Essay by Charles Moffet.
 Day for Night. New York: Aperture; San Francisco, Pier 24 Photography, 2015. . Essays by Richard Learoyd, Martin Barnes and Nancy Gryspeerdt
Richard Learoyd: The Silence of the Camera Obscura. Madrid: Fundación MAPFRE, 2019. Essays by Phillip Gefter and Sandra Phillips.

Publications with contributions by Learoyd
Dress Codes: The Third ICP Triennial of Photography and Video. Göttingen: Steidl, 2010. 
About Face. San Francisco: Pier 24 Photography, 2012. . Exhibition guide.
Seduced by Art: Photography Past and Present, London: National Gallery, 2012.  
The Unphotographable. San Francisco: Fraenkel Gallery, 2013. 	
About Face. San Francisco: Pier 24 Photography, 2014. . Exhibition catalog. Edition of 1000 copies. With forewords by Christopher McCall, and Richard Avedon (from In The American West), an introduction by Philip Gefter, and texts by Sandra S. Phillips, and Ulrike Schneider.

Exhibitions

Solo
 1992: Elevations, Stills Gallery, Scotland
 1993: Artificial Horizons, Street Level Gallery, Glasgow, Scotland
 2007: Richard Learoyd, Union Gallery, London
 2009: Unique Photographs, McKee Gallery, New York
 2011: Presence, Fraenkel Gallery, San Francisco, CA
 2011: Portraits and Figures, McKee Gallery, New York
 2013: Still/Life, McKee Gallery, New York
 2013: The Outside World, Fraenkel Gallery, San Francisco, CA
 2015-2016: Richard Learoyd: Dark Mirror, Victoria and Albert Museum, London, 2015/16
 2016: Day for Night, Pace MacGill, New York
 2016: In the Studio, J. Paul Getty Museum, Los Angeles, CA; The Nelson-Atkins Museum of Art, Kansas City, MO
 2017: Richard Learoyd, Fraenkel Gallery, San Francisco, CA
2019: Richard Learoyd: Curious, Pace/MacGill Gallery, New York
2019: Richard Learoyd: The Silence of the Camera Obscura, Fundación Mapfre, Madrid
 2022: Richard Learoyd, Fraenkel Gallery, San Francisco, CA

Group
 2010: Dress Codes The Third ICP Triennial of Photography and Video, International Centre of Photography, New York, curated by Vince Aletti, Kristen Lubben, Christopher Phillips, and Carol Squiers
 2010: Pier 24: The Inaugural Exhibition, Pier 24 Photography, San Francisco, CA (2010)/
 2010: Object Lesson, New York Photo Festival, NY. Curated by Vince Aletti
 2011: The More Things Change, San Francisco Museum of Modern Art, CA
 2012: Seduced by Art: Photography Past and Present, National Gallery, London
 2012-2013: About Face, Pier 24 Photography, San Francisco, CA (2012/13)
 2013: The Unphotographable, Fraenkel Gallery, CA
 2014 Negativeless, Michael Hoppen Gallery, London
 2016-2017: Collected, Pier 24 Photography, San Francisco, CA (2016/17)

Collections
Learoyd's work is held in the following public collections:

References

External links
 SFMOMA Artist Video: Richard Learoyd
 The Outside World Video: Richard Learoyd

1966 births
Living people
Alumni of the Glasgow School of Art
British contemporary artists
Photographers from Lancashire
People from Nelson, Lancashire